Dave Ashok Chokshi (born May 8, 1981) is an American physician and former public health official who served as the 43rd health commissioner of New York City. He is the first health commissioner of Asian descent. Chokshi previously served as the inaugural chief population health officer for NYC Health + Hospitals and as a White House fellow in the United States Department of Veterans Affairs.

Early life and education 
Chokshi was born and raised in Baton Rouge, Louisiana. where he graduated as valedictorian from Baton Rouge Magnet High School. Then, he earned a Bachelor of Arts degree from Duke University, where he double-majored in chemistry and public policy studies. As a Rhodes Scholar, Chokshi earned two Master of Science degrees, in global public health and in comparative social policy, from the University of Oxford. He earned a medical degree from the Perelman School of Medicine at the University of Pennsylvania, where he was elected by his peers to win the Joel Gordon Miller Prize, and completed internal medicine residency at Brigham & Women's Hospital and Harvard Medical School.

Career 
Chokshi previously served in the Louisiana Department of Health during Hurricane Katrina. He was a White House Fellow during the Obama administration and served as principal health advisor to the United States Secretary of Veterans Affairs. Chokshi served on the FEMA delegation to New York City after Hurricane Sandy in 2012. Chokshi has been a primary care internist at Bellevue Hospital since 2014 and a clinical associate professor of population health and medicine at the New York University School of Medicine. In addition to serving as the chief population health officer for NYC Health + Hospitals, Chokshi was also the Chief Executive Officer of the NYC Health + Hospitals Accountable Care Organization, one of the few ACOs in the nation to achieve high quality and cost performance for eight consecutive years.

Chokshi has written widely on public health and medicine including in The New England Journal of Medicine, JAMA, The Lancet, Health Affairs, Science and Scientific American. In 2016, President Obama appointed him to the Advisory Group on Prevention, Health Promotion and Integrative and Public Health.

In August 2020, Chokshi was selected to serve as health commissioner of New York City after the previous commissioner, Oxiris Barbot, resigned amid disagreements with then-Mayor Bill de Blasio over the handling of the COVID-19 pandemic.

In December 2021, Chokshi announced he will serve as health commissioner until March 2022 for purposes of transition for incoming Mayor Eric Adams, after which he will continue to work on pandemic response for the city government.

On October 24, 2022, Chokshi was cited in a ruling by New York Supreme Court Justice Ralph Porzio that found Chokshi's October 20, 2021 vaccine mandate to be "arbitrary and capricious" and that it violated "the separation of powers doctrine".

Personal life 
Chokshi lives in Jackson Heights, Queens with his wife and daughter. Chokshi's wife is a public school teacher and administrator. He is the son of Indian immigrants.

In February 2021, Chokshi tested positive for COVID-19 and shared his personal story to encourage New Yorkers to get vaccinated.

See also 
 Indian Americans in New York City

References 

Living people
Duke University alumni
Perelman School of Medicine at the University of Pennsylvania alumni
American public health doctors
Commissioners of Health of the City of New York
Physicians from New York City
United States Department of Veterans Affairs officials
Physicians from Louisiana
People from Baton Rouge, Louisiana
American people of Indian descent
American Rhodes Scholars
1981 births